The Pakistan Administrative Service, or PAS (previously known as the District Management Group or DMG before 1 June 2012) is an elite cadre of the Civil Services of Pakistan. The Pakistan Administrative Service over the years has emerged as the most consolidated and developed post-colonial institution in Pakistan, with the PAS officers of Grade 22 often seen as stronger than the federal government ministers. The service of PAS is generalist in nature and officers are assigned to different departments all across Pakistan during the course of their careers. Almost all of the country's highest-profile positions such as the Federal Secretaries, the provincial Chief Secretaries, and chairmen of top-heavy organizations like the National Highway Authority, Trading Corporation of Pakistan and State Life Insurance Corporation usually belong to the Pakistan Administrative Service.

Officers in this occupational group are recruited through a national competitive examination held once a year by the Federal Public Service Commission. Those selected for this group have to undergo a two-year training programme at the Civil Services Academy (CSA) in Lahore.

Notable PAS officers
 Ghulam Ishaq Khan
 Chaudhry Muhammad Ali
 Farooq Leghari
 Qudrat Ullah Shahab
 Shehzad Arbab
 Raja Muhammad Abbas
 Kamran Rasool
 Nargis Sethi
 Shahjehan Syed Karim
 Nasir Mahmood Khosa
 Tasneem Noorani
 Syed Darbar Ali Shah
 Mutawakil Kazi
 Shahid Aziz Siddiqi
 Maroof Afzal
 Rizwan Ahmed
 Naveed Kamran Baloch
 Sardar Ahmad Nawaz Sukhera
 Azam Suleman Khan
 Kamran Lashari
 Mir Ahmed Bakhsh Lehri
 Shoaib Mir Memon
 Mumtaz Ali Shah
 Allah Bakhsh Malik
 Iqbal Hussain Durrani
 Babar Yaqoob Fateh Muhammad
 Syed Abu Ahmad Akif
 Jawad Rafique Malik
 Tariq Bajwa
 Fawad Hasan Fawad
 Muhammad Sualeh Ahmad Faruqi
 Sikandar Sultan Raja
 Fazal Abbas Maken
 Agha Jan Akhtar
 Masood Khaddarposh
 Aftab Ghulam Nabi Kazi
 Roedad Khan
 Ishrat Hussain
 Masood Mufti
 Mustafa Zaidi
 Mumtaz Mufti
 Aminullah chaudhry
 Usman Ali Isani
 Shafqat Mahmood
 Orya Maqbool Jan
 Rabiya Javeri Agha
 Hamza Shafqaat

History
The Indian Civil Service (ICS)—also known once as Imperial Civil Service in British India, predecessor of the Civil Service of Pakistan and District Management Group—was established by the British to colonize India and perpetuate the British Raj. After Indian independence in 1947, the Indian Civil Service component ceded to Pakistan was renamed the Civil Service of Pakistan. In 1954, an agreement was reached between the Governor General of Pakistan and the governors of the provinces to constitute an All-Pakistan service valid throughout Pakistan.

Later under the administrative reforms of 1973, the name of Civil Service of Pakistan was changed to District Management Group, which became one of thirteen occupational groups under the All-Pakistan Unified Groups (APUG). Since 1973, each year a new batch of officers undergo a "Common Training Programme" (CTP) which includes officers of thirteen occupational groups at the Civil Services Academy.

Appointments of PAS Officers 
After completing initial training and probation at the Civil Services Academy, officers are posted in field offices throughout Pakistan on Basic Pay Scale (BPS)-17 grade appointments. Officers of the rank of Captains (within 3 to 6 years' service) and equivalents from defense services are also inducted (in three occupational groups; P.A.S, Police and Foreign Services) on allocated quota after recommendations of Chairman Federal Public Service Commission. This quota was introduced by President General Zia ul Haq through an infamous amendment to the law primarily to have domination of military over civil bureaucracy and is still in vogue.

Officers of PAS are first appointed typically as Assistant Commissioners of sub-divisions. They will simultaneously be charged with the responsibilities of Assistant Commissioners of Sub-Divisional level.

The Basic Pay Scales (BPS grades) are enumerated (in order of increasing responsibility) such as:

Post-devolution (2001) scenario 

Post devolution, local government ordinance PLGO 2001. The Divisional Governments/Administrative Divisions were abolished by the then President Pervaiz Musharraf in 2001 and hence the office of Divisional Commissioner was abolished. The Office of Deputy Commissioner was upgraded/up scaled and designated as District Coordination Officer DCO and was deprived of the powers of District Magistrate. However, in 2008, after the presidency of General Musharraf, provincial governments of Pakistan again established the office of Divisional Commissioner.  In 2011 and 2017, the term DCO was also re named as Deputy Commissioner in Sindh and Punjab provinces respectively  and District Magistracy continues to be exercised in the federal capital; however, the institution of the office of the Deputy Commissioner has been deprived of its previously held judicial powers elsewhere in the country.

See also
 Federal Secretary
 Grade 22
 Chief Secretary (Pakistan)
 Deputy Commissioner
 List of serving Generals of the Pakistan Army
 Law enforcement in Pakistan
 Appointment holder in government organizations of Pakistan

References

External links
 Federal Public Service Commission - homepage

Civil service of Pakistan
Pakistan federal departments and agencies